Peconic was a station stop along the Greenport Branch of the Long Island Rail Road in Peconic, New York. The station was originally built as Hermitage station on May 1, 1848 (although some sources claim it dates back to 1844) but was renamed Peconic on the June 1876 timetable. In August 1876 a second Peconic Station replaced the former one, which was built on the south side of the tracks and on the west side of Peconic Lane. This building also served as the post office. That station was razed in April 1942 and replaced with a shelter along the platform. The post office moved to the grocery store next door where it remains to this day. When Cutchogue station was closed in June 1962, the two nearest replacements were Mattituck station, which still exists today, and Peconic station, which was discontinued in 1970.

References

External links
Peconic LIRR Station (TrainsAreFun.com)

Former Long Island Rail Road stations in Suffolk County, New York
Railway stations in the United States opened in 1848
Railway stations closed in 1970
Southold, New York